George Jennings Hinde (24 March 1839 – 18 March 1918) was a British geologist and paleontologist.

Works 
Extensive studies on scolecodonts by George J. Hinde of material from England, Wales, Canada and Sweden  established a basis for the nomenclature of what he regarded as being isolated components of annelid jaws; but study of them lapsed thereafter for almost 50 years.

He also studied conodonts from Canada and the United States or from Scotland. He named the genus Polygnathus in 1879.

He published the Catalogue of the fossil sponges in the Geological Department of the British Museum (Natural History). With descriptions of new and little-known species (Illustrated by 38 lithographic plates.) in 1883

In 1888, he published with John William Dawson New species of fossil sponges from Little Metis, province of Quebec, Canada.

Awards 
In 1896, he became a Fellow of the Royal Society. 	

In 1897, he was a recipient of the Lyell Medal, a prestigious annual scientific medal given by the Geological Society of London.

Tributes 
The Hinde Medal is an award given by the Pander Society, an informal organisation founded in 1967 for the promotion of the study of conodont palaeontology.

The conodont genera Hindeodella, Hindeodelloides and Hindeodus are named after G.J. Hinde.

The specific epithet hindei, referring to prehistoric animals, is a tribute to G.J. Hinde. It can be found in species such as:
 Diagoniella hindei, a sponge species
 Choia hindei, a sponge species
 Calceolispongia hindei, a crinoid species

References

External links 
 
 Obituary—George Jennings Hinde by Henry Woodward - 1918 (retrieved 1 May 2016)

English palaeontologists
Conodont specialists
1839 births
1918 deaths
Lyell Medal winners